Nakshatravana, also called Nakshatravanam or Nakshatravan, is a sacred grove in Sringeri, Karnataka, India. It is associated with the Sringeri Sharada Peetham monastery, and consists of 27 trees that are related to 27 Nakshatras of Indian Astrology. The grove also includes over 120 medicinal plants found in the Western Ghats. The Nakshatras and the trees are as below:

Considering the diversity of plants involved, their medicinal value, and association with Nakshatras, many organisations are popularizing the creation of Nakshatravanam.

References

Nakshatra
Sacred groves of India